Black Oak Arkansas is the 1971 eponymous debut album by Black Oak Arkansas.

Track listing
All selections written and arranged by Black Oak Arkansas, except where noted.
 "Uncle Lijiah" - 3:17
 "Memories at the Window" - 3:05
 "The Hills of Arkansas" - 3:45  
 "I Could Love You" - 6:10
 "Hot and Nasty" (Daugherty, Jett, Knight, Reynolds, Smith, Stone) - 2:55
 "Singing the Blues" (Melvin Endsley) - 2:17
 "Lord Have Mercy on My Soul" - 6:15
 "When Electricity Came to Arkansas" - 4:26

Personnel
Black Oak Arkansas
Jim "Dandy" Mangrum - lead vocals, washboard
Rickie "Ricochet" Reynolds - 12-string rhythm guitar, vocals
Pat "Dirty" Daugherty - bass guitar, vocals
Harvey "Burley" Jett - lead guitar, banjo, piano, vocals
Stanley "Goober" Knight - lead and steel guitar, organ, vocals
Wayne "Squeezebox" Evans - drums

Production
Sheldon Krechman, Lee D. Weisel - executive production
Brian Bruderlin, Stan Ross - engineer
Jay Senter, Doc Siegel - remixing
Eve Babitz - cover design, photography

Charts
Album - Billboard (United States)

References

1971 debut albums
Black Oak Arkansas albums
Atco Records albums
Albums produced by Lee Dorman
Albums produced by Mike Pinera
Albums recorded at Gold Star Studios